1 Centauri, or i Centauri, is a yellow-white-hued binary star system in the southern constellation Centaurus. It can be seen with the naked eye, having an apparent visual magnitude of +4.23. Based upon an annual parallax shift of 51.54 mas as seen from Earth's orbit, it is located 51.5 light-years from the Sun. The system is moving closer to the Sun with a radial velocity of −21.5 km/s.

Spectrographic images taken at the Cape Observatory between 1921 and 1923 showed this star has a variable radial velocity, which indicated this is a single-lined spectroscopic binary star system. The pair have an orbital period of 9.94 days and an eccentricity of about 0.2.

The primary component has received a number of different stellar classifications. For example, Jaschek et al. (1964) lists F0V, F2III, F4III and F4IV, thus ranging in evolutionary state from an ordinary F-type main-sequence star to a giant star. More recently, Houk (1982) listed a class of F3 V, matching an ordinary main-sequence star that is generating energy through hydrogen fusion at its core. The NStars project gives it a classification of F2 V.

References

F-type main-sequence stars
Spectroscopic binaries
Centaurus (constellation)
Centauri, i
CD-32 09603
Centauri, 1
Gliese and GJ objects
119756
067153
5168